Tawonga Chimodzi (born 26 June 1988) is a Malawian footballer who currently plays as a midfielder for the Cypriot side Karmiotissa FC and the Malawi national football team.

Career
He signed for the Greek club Iraklis Psachna in August 2013.

Before the 2019–20 season, Chimodzi joined Karmiotissa FC.

References

External links
 

1988 births
Living people
People from Lilongwe
Malawian footballers
Malawi international footballers
Malawian expatriate sportspeople in South Africa
Association football midfielders
Santos F.C. (South Africa) players
Malawian expatriate footballers
Expatriate soccer players in South Africa
Silver Strikers FC players
Iraklis Psachna F.C. players
Platanias F.C. players
AEZ Zakakiou players
A.E. Sparta P.A.E. players
ASIL Lysi players
Expatriate footballers in Greece
Malawian expatriate sportspeople in Greece